Dominic Wesonga (born 16 July 1988) is a cricketer who plays for the Kenya cricket team. He played in four One Day International (ODI) matches in 2010 and 2011. In August 2021, he was named in Kenya's Twenty20 International (T20I) squad for the 2021–22 Uganda Tri-Nation Series. He made his T20I debut on 11 September 2021, for Kenya against Nigeria.

References

External links
 

1988 births
Living people
Kenyan cricketers
Kenya One Day International cricketers
Kenya Twenty20 International cricketers
Cricketers from Nairobi